The 1946 Kentucky State Thorobreds football team was an American football team that represented Kentucky State Industrial College (now known as Kentucky State University) as a member of the Midwest Athletic Association (MAA) during the 1946 college football season. Led by Robert White in his first and only season as head coach, the Thorobreds compiled a 5–4 record and outscored opponents by a total of 111 to 77. 

In December 1946, The Pittsburgh Courier applied the Dickinson System to the black college teams and rated Kentucky State at No. 19. 

The team played its home games at Alumni Field in Frankfort, Kentucky.

Schedule

References

Kentucky State
Kentucky State Thorobreds football seasons
Kentucky State Thorobreds football